The 2021 AFC Women's Club Championship (also known as the AFC Women’s Club Championship 2021 Pilot Tournament (West)) was the second edition of AFC's premier women's club football competition, held between 7 and 13 November. Four clubs from four associations competed.

Teams
The following teams played in the West Zone tournament.

Initially, an East Zone tournament including teams from Thailand, Vietnam, Myanmar and Taiwan, was also announced. In late July, it was announced that due to COVID-19 restrictions, there was no interest from the clubs in the East to host the tournament,  and it was subsequently cancelled.

Format
Teams played in a single round-robin.

Tiebreakers
Teams were ranked according to points (3 points for a win, 1 point for a draw, 0 points for a loss), and if tied on points, the following tiebreaking criteria were applied, in the order given, to determine the rankings:
Points in head-to-head matches among tied teams;
Goal difference in head-to-head matches among tied teams;
Goals scored in head-to-head matches among tied teams;
If more than two teams are tied, and after applying all head-to-head criteria above, a subset of teams are still tied, all head-to-head criteria above are reapplied exclusively to this subset of teams;
Goal difference in all group matches;
Goals scored in all group matches;
Penalty shoot-out if only two teams are tied and they met in the last round of the group;
Disciplinary points (yellow card = 1 point, red card as a result of two yellow cards = 3 points, direct red card = 3 points, yellow card followed by direct red card = 4 points);
Drawing of lots.

Standings

Matches 
All times were in EET (UTC+2).

Goalscorers

See also
Continental Club Championship
2021 AFC Champions League (AFC) (Asia)
2021 CAF Women's Champions League (CAF) (Africa)
2021 Copa Libertadores Femenina (CONMEBOL) (South America)
2021–22 UEFA Women's Champions League (UEFA) (Europe)

Regional Club Championship
2021 UNCAF Women's Interclub Championship (UNCAF) (Central America)
2021 WAFF Women's Clubs Championship (WAFF) (West Asia)

Notes

References

External links

2021
2021 in women's association football
 Women's Club Championship
AFC